Lee Young-jin is a Korean name consisting of the family name Lee (이) and the given name Young-jin (영진). It may refer to:

 Lee Young-jin (footballer, born 1963), South Korea football manager and former player
 Lee Young-jin (footballer, born 1972), South Korea football coach and former player
 Lee Young-jin (actress) (born 1981), South Korean actress
 Young Jean Lee (born 1974), playwright

See also
 Lee Yong-jin (born 1985), South Korean comedian and singer